Mars' Hill is the official student newspaper of Trinity Western University.  It is funded by the TWU Student Association and according to its website, "seeks to be a professional and relevant student publication, reflecting and challenging the TWU community, while also addressing local, national and international issues".  It started as an underground newspaper in 1988, led by Bruce Beck, but was shut down by administration after only two issues. In 1995, it replaced the current official student newspaper, The Today.

Mars' Hill is published twelve times during the academic school year (September to May), coming out approximately every two weeks. Its current distribution is 2,000, reaching over 6,000 students, faculty, staff and alumni both on and off the Trinity Western University campus. It is also distributed in coffee shops throughout the Greater Vancouver Area and parts of northern Washington, including Seattle and Bellingham, and has a significant online following. 

Mars' Hill has won several awards since its inception in 1995, including the Associated Collegiate Press' National Pacemaker Award for a non-dailies in 2008 and 2010. Mars' Hill is a member of the Associated Collegiate Press. It was named a finalist for the Pacemaker for non-dailies in 2006, 2008, 2009, 2010, and 2013.

See also
 List of student newspapers in Canada
 List of newspapers in Canada

External links
 Mars' Hill Online

Student newspapers published in British Columbia
Trinity Western University
Publications established in 1988
1988 establishments in British Columbia